Guernsey County is a county located in the U.S. state of Ohio. As of the 2020 census, the population was 38,438. Its county seat and largest city is Cambridge. It is named for the Isle of Guernsey in the English Channel, from which many of the county's early settlers emigrated.

Guernsey County comprises the Cambridge, OH Micropolitan Statistical Area, which is also included in the Columbus-Marion-Zanesville, OH Combined Statistical Area.

History
Guernsey County, located in the Appalachian foothills, was first formed and organized on 10 March 1810 from portions of Muskingum and Belmont counties, after the Ohio Legislature acted. The first county commissioners were sworn in on 23 April 1810. It lost some land area during the formation of neighboring counties until it reached its present boundaries in 1851, after Buffalo, Beaver, Olive, and Seneca townships were gained by Noble county. After dispute whether the county seat should be established in Cambridge or Washington, it was established in Cambridge after two individuals proposed to donate the land and furnish the public buildings if built in Cambridge.

Geography

Demographics

2000 census
As of the census of 2000, there were 40,792 people, 16,094 households, and 11,233 families living in the county. The population density was 78 people per square mile (30/km2). There were 18,771 housing units at an average density of 36 per square mile (14/km2). The racial makeup of the county was 96.28% White, 1.53% Black or African American, 0.31% Native American, 0.30% Asian, 0.22% from other races, and 1.36% from two or more races. 0.62% of the population were Hispanic or Latino of any race. 96.7% spoke English, 1.3% Spanish and 1.1% German as their first language.

There were 16,094 households, out of which 32.40% had children under the age of 18 living with them, 53.90% were married couples living together, 11.40% had a female householder with no husband present, and 30.20% were non-families. 26.10% of all households were made up of individuals, and 11.20% had someone living alone who was 65 years of age or older. The average household size was 2.50 and the average family size was 3.00.

In the county, the population was spread out, with 26.20% under the age of 18, 7.90% from 18 to 24, 27.50% from 25 to 44, 24.00% from 45 to 64, and 14.50% who were 65 years of age or older. The median age was 38 years. For every 100 females there were 94.50 males. For every 100 females age 18 and over, there were 91.40 males.

The median income for a household in the county was $30,110, and the median income for a family was $35,660. Males had a median income of $30,142 versus $20,804 for females. The per capita income for the county was $15,542. About 12.90% of families and 16.00% of the population were below the poverty line, including 21.50% of those under age 18 and 12.30% of those age 65 or over.

2010 census
As of the 2010 United States Census, there were 40,087 people, 16,210 households, and 10,949 families living in the county. The racial makeup of the county was 96.0% white, 1.5% black or African American, 0.3% Asian, 0.2% American Indian, 0.2% from other races, and 1.8% from two or more races. Those of Hispanic or Latino origin made up 0.9% of the population. In terms of ancestry, 22.3% were German, 15.2% were Irish, 12.4% were English, and 9.6% were American.

Of the 16,210 households, 31.1% had children under the age of 18 living with them, 49.8% were married couples living together, 12.3% had a female householder with no husband present, 32.5% were non-families, and 27.7% of all households were made up of individuals. The average household size was 2.44 and the average family size was 2.95. The median age was 40.9 years.

The median income for a household in the county was $37,573 and the median income for a family was $48,445. Males had a median income of $37,642 versus $29,348 for females. The per capita income for the county was $19,187. About 13.6% of families and 17.3% of the population were below the poverty line, including 26.7% of those under age 18 and 9.5% of those age 65 or over.

Politics
Guernsey County has been dominated by Republican Party candidates in presidential elections, with Democrats only winning the county in six presidential elections from 1856 on. The most recent of these Democrats to win the county was Bill Clinton in 1996.

|}

Communities

City
 Cambridge (county seat)

Villages

 Byesville
 Cumberland
 Fairview
 Lore City
 Old Washington
 Pleasant City
 Quaker City
 Senecaville

Townships

 Adams
 Cambridge
 Center
 Jackson
 Jefferson
 Knox
 Liberty
 Londonderry
 Madison
 Millwood
 Monroe
 Oxford
 Richland
 Spencer
 Valley
 Washington
 Westland
 Wheeling
 Wills

Census-designated places
 Buffalo
 Kimbolton
 Salesville

Unincorporated communities
 Antrim
 Birmingham
 Claysville
 Derwent
 Elizabethtown
 Kings Mine
 Kipling
 Opperman
 Walhonding

See also
 Big Muskie
 Guernsey County Courthouse
 National Register of Historic Places listings in Guernsey County, Ohio

References

Further reading
 Thomas William Lewis, History of Southeastern Ohio and the Muskingum Valley, 1788-1928. In Three Volumes. Chicago: S.J. Clarke Publishing Co., 1928.

External links

 Official Guernsey County website

 
Appalachian Ohio
Counties of Appalachia
1810 establishments in Ohio
Populated places established in 1810
Guernsey diaspora
British-American culture in Ohio